is an American figure skater. With partner John Zimmerman, she is the 2002 World bronze medalist and a three-time (2000–2002) U.S. national champion. The pair also competed at the 2002 Winter Olympics. With previous partner Jason Dungjen, Ina was a two-time (1997 & 1998) U.S. champion and competed at the 1994 and 1998 Olympics.

Personal life 
Kyoko Ina was born in Tokyo, Japan and raised in New York. Her grandfather, Katsuo Okazaki, was an Olympic runner (and Japanese Foreign Minister between 1952 and 1954), her grandmother, Shimako Okazaki, was a tennis player, and her mother, Yoshi Ina, competed as a swimmer and a sculler.

Skating career 
Ina started skating at the rink at Rockefeller Center at the age of three or four. She skated singles and pairs for Japan in the Junior ranks, but eventually decided to compete solely for the United States.

Her first American partnership was with Jason Dungjen from 1991 to 1998, under the coaching of Peter Burrows and Marylynn Gelderman in Monsey, New York. They placed 4th at the 1998 Winter Olympics but withdrew from the 1998 World Championships after an accident during a practice session – while practicing a triple twist, Ina's arm hit Dungjen's forehead, fracturing the browbone above his right eye. Their partnership ended following that season.

Ina teamed up with John Zimmerman in 1998. Initially, they were coached by Peter Burrows and Mary Lynn Gelderman in Monsey, New York and they also commuted to Stamford, Connecticut, to work with Tamara Moskvina. They later trained under Moskvina and Igor Moskvin in Hackensack, New Jersey.

Ina and Zimmerman are able to capitalize on their height difference and perform various difficult lifts. They won three U.S. Championships and competed at the 2002 Winter Olympics. They won the bronze medal at the 2002 World Championships.

Ina had not yet turned professional when, on July 18, 2002, the USADA chose to perform an out-of-competition doping test on her. The agent came to her home for an unscheduled test at 10:30 at night. Ina stated that she could not produce the urine sample because she had already prepared to go to sleep. Ina was led to believe by the agent that the test could be rescheduled for the following day, but she was later charged with refusing to take a doping test. She was suspended by the USADA because of this and faced fines. Despite what had been reported, Ina never faced suspension from the International Skating Union because the refused test was a national out of competition test. Ina's case was further complicated because it was not clear at the time if she had or had not officially retired from competition at the time of the attempted test. Ina eventually filed a case with the Court of Arbitration for Sport, but later withdrew it. In the end, Ina accepted a two-year sanction from the USADA.

Ina and Zimmerman skated with the Stars on Ice tour for many years. In 2010, Ina competed in the second season of the Canadian reality competition Battle of the Blades partnered with retired NHL player Kelly Chase.

Ina currently coaches in New York.

Ina was inducted into the U.S. Figure Skating Hall of Fame in 2018.

Programs

With Zimmerman

With Dungjen

Competitive history 
GP: Champions Series / Grand Prix

Pair skating with Zimmerman

Pair skating with Dungjen

Single skating for the United States

Single skating for Japan

References

External links 

 

1972 births
American female pair skaters
Japanese female pair skaters
Japanese female single skaters
Figure skaters at the 1994 Winter Olympics
Figure skaters at the 1998 Winter Olympics
Figure skaters at the 2002 Winter Olympics
Living people
Olympic figure skaters of the United States
Sportspeople from Tokyo
Japanese emigrants to the United States
Battle of the Blades participants
American sportspeople of Japanese descent
World Figure Skating Championships medalists
Four Continents Figure Skating Championships medalists
Universiade medalists in figure skating
Universiade silver medalists for the United States
Competitors at the 1991 Winter Universiade
Competitors at the 1993 Winter Universiade
21st-century American women